Bart Deurloo (born February 23, 1991) is a Dutch male artistic gymnast and a member of the national team. He participated in four editions of the World Championships (2009, 2013, 2015), and 2017 World Artistic Gymnastics Championships, where he won the bronze on high bar in Montreal. and qualified for the 2016 Summer Olympics.

References

External links 
 
 
 

1991 births
Living people
Dutch male artistic gymnasts
Sportspeople from Ridderkerk
Gymnasts at the 2016 Summer Olympics
Olympic gymnasts of the Netherlands
Gymnasts at the 2020 Summer Olympics
20th-century Dutch people
21st-century Dutch people